VPK is an acronym that may refer to:

 The Military-Industrial Commission of the USSR (1957–1991)
 Military Industrial Company, Russian manufacturer of armored military vehicles
 The Left Party (Sweden) (1917–present)
 Vata, Pitta and Kapha, the three doshas, according to Ayurveda